The 1937–38 Scottish Second Division was won by Raith Rovers who, along with second placed Albion Rovers, were promoted to the First Division. Brechin City finished bottom.

Table

References

Scottish Football Archive

Scottish Division Two seasons
2
Scot